George Robert Webb (10 July 1886 – 20 July 1958) was a Progressive Conservative party member of the House of Commons of Canada. He was born in Gananoque, Ontario and became an insurance agent by career.

Webb was mayor of Gananoque, Ontario at one time. He owned and operated George R. Webb Insurance Agencies, and also the automotive retail firm Webb Motor Sales.

He was elected to Parliament at the Leeds riding in the 1945 general election and served one term, the 20th Canadian Parliament, then did not seek re-election in the 1949 election.

References

External links
 

1886 births
1958 deaths
20th-century Canadian businesspeople
Mayors of places in Ontario
Members of the House of Commons of Canada from Ontario
Progressive Conservative Party of Canada MPs